Cape May Seashore Lines  is a short line railroad in southern New Jersey that operates both freight trains and excursion trains. It offers two excursion services: a  round trip between Richland and Tuckahoe along the Beesley's Point Secondary railroad line and a  round trip between Rio Grande, Cold Spring Village, and Cape May City along the Cape May Branch (service between Rio Grande and Cape May is suspended due to theft of track material and damage along the Cape May Branch). The track is owned by NJ Transit and leased to the Seashore Lines. The Cape May Branch is the original line operated by the Cape May Seashore Lines and runs from Cape May north to Tuckahoe, connecting to the Beesley's Point Secondary in Tuckahoe. Cape May Seashore Lines operates freight service along the Beesley's Point Secondary line between Winslow and Palermo, interchanging with Conrail Shared Assets Operations in Winslow. Tony Macrie has been president of the Seashore Lines since he formed the railroad in 1984.

History

Predecessor lines
The line to Cape May was built in 1863 by the Tuckahoe and Cape May Railroad, and operated by the Philadelphia and Reading Railway's Atlantic City Railroad and later Pennsylvania-Reading Seashore Lines (PRSL). At one time, the rail line was known as "The Steel Speedway To The Shore”. Eventually it became part of Conrail, which ended passenger service on the line in 1981, ended freight service on October 10, 1983 and sold the line to New Jersey Transit as their Cape May Branch.

Establishment of CMSL
The Seashore Lines was founded by Tony Macrie (CEO) in January 1984. Regular train service between Cape May Court House and Cold Spring Village began in 1996. Service was extended in Cape May City in 1999 after repairs to the swing bridge crossing the Cape May Canal were completed.

In 2005, mechanical issues with the Cape May Canal swing bridge prevented trains from entering the city of Cape May. Although the bridge was repaired a year later, a severe storm in April 2007 damaged the tracks and left locomotives stranded in Tuckahoe. Passenger train service between Rio Grande and Cape May City resumed on October 12, 2009.

New Jersey Seashore Lines

New Jersey Seashore Lines (NJSL) is a subsidiary of Cape May Seashore Lines. New Jersey Seashore Lines was created by Cape May Seashore Lines in conjunction with the Clayton Sand Co. in Chatsworth. Using state and federal grants New Jersey Seashore Lines has rehabilitated  of track between Lakehurst and the Woodmansie section of Chatsworth (which itself is part of Woodland Township), where Clayton operates a sand mine. New Jersey Seashore Lines had originally planned to operate rail service to transport sand and gravel from Clayton and serve the needs of any other customers that might need rail service along the line. The line was originally owned by the Central Railroad of New Jersey and was once part of the route of the famed Blue Comet. South of Woodmansie the tracks are abandoned leaving no connection from the south. Neither CMSL, their subsidiary NJSL or Clayton Sand Co. have released any information on the current or future plans for the line and if or when operation may begin.

Lines
Richland- Tuckahoe Station, Tuckahoe
Rio Grande Station, Rio Grande - Cape May

Current Service 
The Seashore Lines currently operates excursion trains on 15 miles of Conrail's Beesley's Point Secondary between Tuckahoe and Richland. Current passenger train operations include the Valentine’s Express, St. Patrick’s Express, Easter Bunny Express, Ice Cream Express, and the Santa Express service. Train sets primarily consist of the railroad's two GP38 diesel locomotives and six passenger cars. The Seashore Lines operates occasional passenger excursions for the Buena Vista Township / Richland Village Festival, as well as the Annual Tuckahoe Transportation Heritage Festival.

Freight Service Expansion 
In November, 2021, the Seashore Lines filed with the Surface Transportation Board to operate freight rail service on the former Conrail Beesley's Point Secondary Track between Winslow and Palermo, a distance of approximately 30 miles. Service began in 
February of 2022.

2012 vandalism
On March 1, 2012, the Seashore Lines received a telephone call from the New Jersey State Police, advising them that theft of track material had occurred on their Cape May Branch in Dennisville. This is the Seashore Lines’ main line between Tuckahoe and Cape May City. The investigating trooper informed them that several individuals associated with the theft had been arrested and charged with indictable offenses. Arrested on Monday, March 5, were a father and son team from the Villas section of Lower Township, New Jersey, along with a third individual from Rio Grande.

Several days later, Macrie and two Seashore Lines employees conducted a detailed track inspection of the entire area of the theft, which consisted primarily of the removal of tie plates and spikes. This inspection concluded that the area of the theft encompassed approximately 6,800 feet (1 1/4 miles), or 75 percent of the total number of tie plates and spikes in that particular section of track. In their actions to remove the tie plates and spikes, the perpetrators also damaged and destroyed numerous cross ties.

Excursion trains did not run during the summer of 2012 due to the damage from the vandalism. The company occasionally offered rides to the public on railroad speeder vehicles along several miles of undamaged track on the Cape May Branch. As of early 2022 Rio Grande-Cape May service remains suspended.

Beginning in 2020 Seashore Lines partnered with a railbiking company. The railbike trail uses approximately 4 miles of track between the welcome center near Cape May Station to just before the bridge at Cape May Channel.  In March 2022 members of the Cape May city council began negotiating with the owner of the tracks, the New Jersey Department of Transportation, to remove the trackage around the station for conversion to a walking trail.

Roster
The Seashore Lines owns and leases a large roster of equipment:

Three EMD GP38's, two leased from GATX, one leased from LLPX. Two of which are ex. PRSL #'s 2011 and 2012, respectively.
Eight of the 12 original PRSL Budd Rail Diesel Cars (RDC), two of which are restored and in operating condition (M-407, M-410).
Restored Long Island Rail Road (LIRR) Tavern Lounge car "Good Vibrations".
Pennsylvania Railroad (PRR) sleeping car "Braddock Inn" and Pullman parlor car "Mineral Springs". Braddock Inn has been restored for service. Mineral Springs was assigned to the PRR and sold for PRR MofW usage after retirement from Pullman service.
Restored New York Central Railroad (NYC) coach & tavern lounge No. 38.
Restored Atchison, Topeka and Santa Fe Railway (ATSF) Pullman Company Observation Lounge car "Vista Valley".
several P70 coaches, including the last two surviving PRSL P70 coaches.
four cabooses, including the last remaining PRSL caboose.
an RS3m, formerly PRR 8481, wearing Conrail blue.
Central Railroad of New Jersey (CNJ) observation car, "Tempel", used on the famed train "The Blue Comet", and wearing Comet colors of blue and cream.

See also

 List of New Jersey railroads

References

External links

Cape May Seashore Lines - Official site
CMSL photos at Octrainguy.com
 County Rail System? Adocates: $27 Million Needed

New Jersey railroads
Spin-offs of Conrail
Transportation in Cape May County, New Jersey
Heritage railroads in New Jersey